Davidsea attenuata is a Sri Lankan species of bamboo in the grass family.

Davidsea attenuata is only known species of the genus Davidsea. The people of its natural range in Sri Lanka use the leaves to weave baskets.

References

Bambusoideae
Endemic flora of Sri Lanka
Bambusoideae genera
Monotypic Poaceae genera